Bernard Fagan (born 29 January 1949) is an English former professional footballer who played as a defender. Fagan is currently active in the United States as a coach.

Career

Playing career
Born in Sunderland, Fagan began his career with the youth team of his hometown club, before making his professional debut in 1969 with Northampton Town. Fagan played non-league football with Scarborough, before moving to the United States in 1974 to sign with the newly created Seattle Sounders of the North American Soccer League. In 1975, he began the season in Seattle but was traded to the Los Angeles Aztecs at mid-season. In 1977, he again began the season with the Aztecs but moved to the Los Angeles Skyhawks of the American Soccer League. In 1978, Fagan again began the season with one team, the Colorado Caribous of the NASL, and ended it with another, the Southern California Lazers of the American Soccer League. In 1979, he moved indoors with the Detroit Lightning of the Major Indoor Soccer League. He then finished his career with the Portland Timbers of the NASL.

Coaching career
After retiring as a player, Fagan became a soccer coach. From 1985 to 1988, he coached F.C. Portland in the Western Soccer Alliance. He is currently head coach of Warner Pacific College, and he also runs the Bernie Fagan Soccer Camps.

References

1949 births
Living people
American Soccer League (1933–1983) players
Colorado Caribous players
Detroit Lightning players
English footballers
English expatriate footballers
Los Angeles Aztecs players
Los Angeles Skyhawks players
Major Indoor Soccer League (1978–1992) players
North American Soccer League (1968–1984) players
North American Soccer League (1968–1984) indoor players
Northampton Town F.C. players
Portland Timbers (1975–1982) players
Portland Timbers (WSA/APSL) coaches
Scarborough F.C. players
Seattle Sounders (1974–1983) players
Southern California Lazers players
Sunderland A.F.C. players
English Football League players
Warner Pacific University faculty
Western Soccer Alliance coaches
Footballers from Tyne and Wear
Association football defenders
English expatriate sportspeople in the United States
Expatriate soccer players in the United States
English expatriate football managers
College men's soccer coaches in the United States